Robert John McLean Boyle (7 December 1876 – 10 September 1927) was an Australian rules footballer who played with Carlton in the Victorian Football League (VFL).

Boyle, a half back flanker in North Melbourne's 1903 VFA premiership team, was used as a centreman during his time at Carlton. It was in that position that he appeared in their 1904 Grand Final loss and after losing his place in the side just one match into the 1906 season, thus missing out on that year's premiership, Boyle retired and took up umpiring.

He officiated in 59 VFL matches as a field umpire and 15 matches as a boundary umpire from 1907 to 1917. He was appointed to the 1916 VFL Grand Final on the boundary but chose to field umpire the final of the Ariah Park Association. He was replaced on the boundary by Bill Roy. Boyle was one of the umpires at the 1908 Melbourne Carnival.

References
Holmesby, Russell and Main, Jim (2007). The Encyclopedia of AFL Footballers. 7th ed. Melbourne: Bas Publishing.
AFLUA web site: 1916 Grand Final change

External links

1876 births
Australian rules footballers from Melbourne
Carlton Football Club players
North Melbourne Football Club (VFA) players
Australian Football League umpires
1927 deaths
People from North Melbourne